Claytonville is an unincorporated community in Clarke County, Virginia. Claytonville lies on Bishop Meade Road (State Route 255).

Unincorporated communities in Clarke County, Virginia
Unincorporated communities in Virginia